Ivan V. Lalić (8 June 1931 – 28 July 1996) was a Serbian and Yugoslav poet. He was also a translator of poetry from English, French and German into his mother tongue.

Biography
Lalić was born in Belgrade; his father, Vlajko, was a journalist, and his grandfather Isidor Bajić was a composer. His poems tell of a happy childhood, but also of two teenage traumas. As a child in Belgrade, many of his school-friends perished in a 1944 air-raid - as described in the poem "Zardjala igla (A rusty needle)". Lalić said that "my childhood and boyhood in the war marked everything I ever wrote as a poem or poetry".  A second trauma was the loss of his mother, Ljubica Bajić, from tuberculosis in 1946.

Ivan V. Lalić finished high school in Zagreb, where he studied law. Here he met his wife Branka (née Kašnar), who was studying English and music. They married in 1956. Ivan described her as "the spirit behind my poems", and her presence remains in his verse at all stages of his poetic oeuvre.

Ivan V. Lalić published his first poems in 1952, and his first collection of poetry in 1955; the last appeared in 1996, the year of his death. After initially working as a literary editor for Radio Zagreb, he moved to Belgrade in 1961 to take up a new post: Secretary of the Yugoslav Writer's Union. Then, from 1979 until his retirement in 1993, he worked as an editor for the Nolit publishing house in Belgrade.

Ivan and Branka Lalić spent the summers with their family in the Istrian town of Rovinj. They had two sons. The elder, Vlajko, died in a sailing accident between Rovinj and Venice in 1989. Ivan V. Lalić died suddenly in Belgrade in 1996. He was survived by his wife Branka, and his younger son Marko.

Thought and themes 
In her obituary of Lalić, Celia Hawkesworth spoke of "the central place in his work of memory: fragile in the face of the collapse of civilisations, but all we have. Memory allows the poet to recreate brief instants of personal joy as well as to conjure up a sense of the distant past. It allows each of us, as individuals condemned to solitude, to connect with a shared inheritance and feel, for a moment, part of a larger whole."

Legacy
Lalić is recognised as one of Yugoslavia’s and Serbia’s most accomplished poets. In Aleksandar Jovanović’s words, “his work does not only stand at the peak of Serbian poetry in the second half of [the 20th] century, but is at the peak of Serbian poetry in general”.

Lalić was admired abroad and books of his poems have been translated into six languages (English, French, Italian, Polish, Hungarian and Macedonian). Individual poems have appeared in more than 20 languages. UK critics have described his work as "vital and intense", with a "magisterial transcendent quality", and his "lyrics [as] ablaze with successes of metaphor", with an "irresistible blend of private lyricism and public force".

Awards
Lalić was awarded many literary prizes, including Yugoslavia's and Serbia's most prestigious awards: 
Nagrada tribine mladih (1960), 
Zmajeva nagrada (1961), 
Nagrada jugoslovenske radiodifuzije (1965), 
Nolitova nagrada (1969), 
Nagrada "Miloš Đurić" (1978), 
Nagrada "Branko Miljković" (1985), 
Gost Disovog proleća (1987), 
Oktobarska Nagrada Beograda (1988), 
Thornton Wilder Prize (USA, 1990), 
Nagrada "Meša Selimović" (1992), 
Nagrada "Stanislav Vinaver" (1992), 
Nagrada lista Borba (1992), 
Velika Bazjaške povelja (Romania, 1994), 
Nagrada "Braća Micić" (1995) 
Nagrada "Vasko Popa" (1996), 
Žička hrisovulja (1996), 
Račanska povelja (1996), 
Vitalova Nagrada "Zlatni suncokret" (1996).

Bibliography
During his long poetic career, Ivan V. Lalić published eleven collections of poetry in his mother tongue.
 Bivši dečak (‘Once a Boy’, 1955)
 Vetrovito proleće (‘Windy Spring’, 1956)
 Velika Vrata Mora (‘The Great Gates of the Sea’, 1958)
 Melisa (‘Melissa’, 1959)
 Argonauti i druge pesme (‘The Argonauts and other poems’, 1961)
 Čin (‘Act’, 1963)
 Krug (‘Circle’, 1968)
 Smetnje na Vezama (‘Fading Contact’, 1975)
 Strasna Mera (‘The Passionate Measure’, 1984)
 Pismo (‘Script’, 1992)
 Četiri kanona (‘Four Canons’, 1996)
Lalić also produced two selections of his work:
 Vreme, vatre, vrtovi (‘Time, Fires, Gardens’, 1961). This includes the complete Melisa, plus poems selected from his other four early books, including Argonauti i druge pesme. In this volume, Lalić defined the early poems that he saw as part of his poetic legacy, and set aside what he saw as slighter juvenilia: he regarded it not as “a book of selected poems, but […] his first real book”.
Izabrane i nove pesme (‘Selected and New Poems’, 1969) – published in English translation as A Rusty Needle. The “selected” poems are largely from Vreme, vatre, vrtovi and his two subsequent books Čin and Krug. The “new” poems form the cycle O delima ljubavi, ili Vizantija (‘Of the Works of Love, or Byzantium’). 
A compilation of all Ivan V. Lalić’s published work – Dela (‘Works’) – was in preparation at his sudden death in 1996. Edited by Aleksandar Jovanović, it appeared in 1997. It contains three volumes of poetry and one of prose.

In English translation

Poems by Lalić, in his own translation, appeared in the landmark 1965 first issue of Modern Poetry in Translation (ed. Ted Hughes and Daniel Weissbort) - an influential UK magazine which helped to establish 'new European poetry' as a driving force in UK poetic culture.

Two book-length selections of Ivan V. Lalić’s poetry appeared in Charles Simic’s translation, both in the USA:
Fire Gardens (New Rivers, 1970) 
Roll Call of Mirrors (Wesleyan University Press, 1988). 
Six editions of Ivan V. Lalić’s poetry have appeared in Francis R. Jones's translation. Five are with Anvil Press (London):
The Works of Love: Selected Poems (1981) 
Last Quarter: Poems from The Passionate Measure (1985), co-published with Turret, London 
The Passionate Measure (1989), a translation of Strasna mera, co-published with Dedalus, Dublin 
A Rusty Needle (1996), a translation of Izabrane i nove pesme
Fading Contact (1997), a translation of Smetnje na vezama
The sixth appeared with Belgrade University’s Univerzitetska biblioteka “Svetozar Marković”:
 Walking Towards the Sea / Koraci prema moru (2014)

External links 
Translated works by Ivan V. Lalić

References

1931 births
1996 deaths
Writers from Belgrade
Serbian male poets
20th-century Serbian poets